John Stanford (died 1603) was an English politician.

He was a Member (MP) of the Parliament of England for Leicester in 1597.

References

16th-century births
1603 deaths
English MPs 1597–1598